The Midland Depot is a historic railroad station at 205 Midland Street in Clarendon, Arkansas.  It is a modest single-story brick building, built about 1912 by the Arkansas Midland Railroad, a short-lived short-run railroad connecting Little Rock and Helena.  The station was abandoned in 1917 when the tracks were removed, and has since seen a variety of commercial uses.

The station was listed on the National Register of Historic Places in 1984.

See also
National Register of Historic Places listings in Monroe County, Arkansas

References

Railway stations on the National Register of Historic Places in Arkansas
Railway stations in the United States opened in 1912
Railway stations closed in 1917
1912 establishments in Arkansas
National Register of Historic Places in Monroe County, Arkansas
Former railway stations in Arkansas